The Story of The Who is a 2-LP compilation album from The Who. The album was released in the UK in September 1976. The album reached number two in the UK charts. Another version of this collection with a different track listing was also released in Japan. This collection has not been released on CD.

The exploding pinball machine comes from film shot for a TV advertisement of the album.

John Entwistle didn't think the album was truly definitive. The Who could only release the tracks that they had the rights to.

Track listing
All songs written by Pete Townshend except where noted.

Side one
"Magic Bus" – 4:27 (Meaty Beaty Big and Bouncy extended version)
"Substitute" – 3:46
"Boris the Spider" (John Entwistle) – 2:28
"Run Run Run" – 2:29
"I'm a Boy" – 3.40
"(Love is Like A) Heat Wave" (Holland–Dozier–Holland) – 1.54
"My Generation" (Live at Leeds edited version) – 2.31

Side two
"Pictures of Lily" – 2:44
"Happy Jack" – 2:13
"The Seeker" – 3:12
"I Can See for Miles" – 4:17
"Bargain" – 5:31
"Squeeze Box" – 2:42

Side three
"Amazing Journey" – 3:23
"The Acid Queen" – 3:34
"Do You Think It's Alright?" – 0:26
"Fiddle About" (Entwistle) – 1:30
"Pinball Wizard" – 2.58
"I'm Free" – 2:39
"Tommy's Holiday Camp" (Keith Moon) – 0:57
"We're Not Gonna Take It" – 7:01

Side four
"Summertime Blues" (Live at Leeds) (Eddie Cochran and Jerry Capehart) – 3:29
"Baba O'Riley" – 4.59
"Behind Blue Eyes" – 3:40
"Slip Kid" – 4:26
"Won't Get Fooled Again" – 8:31

Because The Who by Numbers was released by CBS/Sony in Japan, the Japanese release had a slightly different track listing. "Squeeze Box" and "Slip Kid" were replaced by "Mary Anne with the Shaky Hand" and "Dogs", respectively. Also, the live edit of "My Generation" is replaced by the original 1965 version.

Charts

Weekly charts

Year-end charts

Certifications and sales

References

The Who compilation albums
1976 compilation albums